Satyajit is a common Indian name. The word is a compound of the words for truthful (Satya), and winner (jit). Some noted personalities with the name Satyajit are:

Satyajit Ray (1921-1992) - noted Indian filmmaker.
Sathyajith - Kannada film actor.
Satyajit Chatterjee - former soccer player and coach.
Satyajit Mayor - Indian biologist who serves as director of the National Centre for Biological Sciences, Bangalore. 
Satyajit Sharma - Indian film and television actor.
Satyajit Bhatkal - Indian television and film director, creator of Satyamev Jayate.

Indian masculine given names